Megapyge is a genus of spiders in the family Thomisidae. It was first described in 1947 by Caporiacco. , it contains only one species, Megapyge rufa, of Guyana.

References

Thomisidae
Monotypic Araneomorphae genera
Spiders of South America